Marcos Baghdatis was the defending champion but decided not to participate this year.Karol Beck won against Gilles Müller 6–7(4), 6–4, 7–5 in the final.

Seeds

Draw

Finals

Top half

Bottom half

References
 Main Draw
 Qualifying Draw

2010 ATP Challenger Tour
2010 Singles